Robert (Rob) Verkerk (born 17 April 1960, in The Hague) is a retired officer of the Netherlands Marine Corps. On 26 September 2014 he succeeded Matthieu Borsboom as Commander of the Naval Forces (Dutch: Commandant Zeestrijdkrachten, CZSK).

Naval career
Verkerk began his career in the Royal Netherlands Navy in 1978 at the Koninklijk Instituut voor de Marine. In 1982 he became officer. After that he underwent commando, parachutist and ski instructor training among other things. He became commanding officer of different Marine platoons, companies and battalions. In the 1990s he was sent to Bosnia and Herzegovina.

Obtaining the rank of a brigadier general Verkerk became Director Operations CZSK in 2007 and Commander of the Marine Corps at the same time. In 2012 he was promoted to major general and became Deputy Commander of the Naval Forces.

On 26 September 2014 he followed vice admiral Matthieu Borsboom and became Commander Naval Forces and was promoted to lieutenant general.

References

External links 
 

1960 births
Living people
Commanders of the Royal Netherlands Navy
Royal Netherlands Marine Corps generals
Military personnel from The Hague